The 1992 BMW Open was an Association of Tennis Professionals men's tennis tournament held in Munich, Germany. It was the 76th edition of the edition of the tournament and was held from 27 April through 4 May 1992. Unseeded Magnus Larsson won the singles title.

Finals

Singles

 Magnus Larsson defeated  Petr Korda 6–4, 4–6, 6–1
 It was Larsson's 3rd title of the year and the 5th of his career.

Doubles

 David Adams /  Menno Oosting defeated  Tomáš Anzari /  Carl Limberger 3–6, 7–5, 6–3
 It was Adams's only title of the year and the 1st of his career. It was Oosting's only title of the year and the 1st of his career.

References

External links 
 ATP – Tournament profile
 ITF – Tournament details

 
BMW Open
Bavarian International Tennis Championships
BMW Open
BMW Open